Firefox OS is an operating system for use on certain specific mobile devices.  This page lists and compares hardware devices that are supplied with a Firefox OS operating system.

Devices

Smartphones

Tablet computer

Other devices

See also
List of open-source mobile phones

References

External links
Official list of Firefox OS devices — at Mozilla.org
FirefoxOSdevices.org

Devices
Firefox OS devices
Technology-related lists
Lists of mobile phones
Lists of mobile computers
Computing comparisons